Carlton Bolling College  is a co-educational secondary school, located in Bradford in West Yorkshire, England. It has more than 1,400 pupils.

It is situated just off Otley Road (A658).

History

There were originally two single-sex grammar schools. Carlton Grammar School (for boys) was on Manor Row in Carlton House. The former school site was destroyed in a fire in 1949. Bolling Girls' Grammar School opened in 1931 on Sheridan Street next to Bolling Hall, although the address later became Flockton Road in East Bowling. By the early 1970s, the girls' school had 650 girls, with 100 in the sixth form; the boys' school had 500 boys with 60 in the sixth form. They merged in 1977 to become Carlton Bolling School. The former girls' school became Bolling College an adult education college, and Flockton House which was demolished in 2015 to make way for housing.

Bolling Girls' Grammar School had a student choir which was widely known and highly regarded around Bradford. The choir continued after the merger with Carlton Grammar School with membership open to female students. The choir was in high demand for performances at venues around the local area particularly during the Christmas period. It also performed at the annual Festival of Remembrance at St George's Hall. The repertoire consisted mostly of show tunes with a particular show being chosen each academic year e.g. South Pacific. Traditional Christmas songs and carols were also performed as well as a special arrangement of Jingle Bells. More challenging musical pieces such as César Franck's Panis angelicus were also included. In 1979 the choir participated in a student exchange with students from Bradford's German Twin City Mönchengladbach. The choir ceased to exist following the retirement of the music teacher responsible for it.

In the 1980s, under the leadership of Dr Mervyn Flecknoe, its modular curriculum, elected student councils, and three-session day with an emphasis on tutorial contact and continuity were picked out by HMI for praise and the school was included as a model case study by Mortimore and Mortimore (1991)"The Secondary Head:  Roles, Responsibilities and Reflections".  The name changed from Carlton Bolling Upper School to Carlton-Bolling College (for ages 13–19) and offered free places on post-16 courses to unemployed adults, with a free crèche, to improve education in the Undercliffe area of Bradford.  The intake of the school became overwhelmingly Muslim with many heritage languages during the late 1980s and early 1990s as the roll rose to 1400 students with a sixth form of 300.  The College formed part of a consortium at sixth form level with Hanson Upper School and Eccleshill Upper School;  a minibus took students to the location of post-16 courses which were planned across the three establishments.

On 15 March 1993, the school featured in a Panorama documentary called A Class Apart about the emergence of an underclass in Asian communities in Britain, narrated by Martin Bashir. The headteacher complained to the Broadcasting Complaints Commission that the college was statistically misrepresented in a negative light. The BCC upheld three of his complaints.

In September 2006, Carlton Bolling College acquired specialist college status for mathematics and computing.

In 2014 BBC Radio Four implicated the school's involvement in the Trojan Horse Scandal which enforces Islamist views through the board of governors.

Previously a community school administered by City of Bradford Metropolitan District Council, in June 2019 Carlton Bolling College converted to academy status.

Academic performance

In March 2007, Carlton Bolling College was inspected by Ofsted and were ranked the first school in Bradford to get an outstanding result.

In 2008, Carlton Bolling College 47.6% of students achieved 5 or more A*-C grades at GCSE levels and 26% including English & Maths. Its average A/AS-Level points per students score was 442.1.

From 29% 5A*-C with English and Mathematics in summer 2009, the results summer 2010 were at 36%. This significant uplift continued summer 2011 to 43%. This is a 14% improvement over 2 years. Summer 2010 student A levels average C,C,C; summer 2011 it has risen to an average of B,B,C per student with students moving on to a variety of university courses such as Law, Medicine, Engineering, Business, ICT, Health related studies, teaching and many more.

In the summer of 2014 Ofsted placed the school in 'special measures'.

Notable former pupils
 Colin Brazier, news presenter for The Live Desk (Sky)
 Steve Rhodes, cricketer (wicket keeper) who played for England
 Tony Wright (musician), lead singer of Terrorvision

Bolling Girls' Grammar School
 Mollie Hillam, potter
 Prof Phyllis Hodgson, Professor of English Language and Mediæval Literature from 1955-72 at Bedford College (London), winner of the Sir Israel Gollancz Prize in 1971
 Brenda Jagger, author

Carlton Grammar School

 Colin Baron, Director-General of Weapons Research at the MoD from 1976–81, and who with John Twinn invented and developed the (cheap but not so effective) Rapier missile system, used in the Falklands War by the 12th Regiment Royal Artillery
 Jeff Bland, Michelin-starred chef at the Balmoral Hotel in Edinburgh
 Dave Brady, folk musician
 Willie Brooke, Labour MP from 1929-31 for Dunbartonshire, and from 1935-39 for Batley and Morley
 Harry Corbett OBE, puppeteer, inventor of Sooty (the longest running children's TV show in the UK)
 Prof Albert Crewe, Professor of Physics from 1963-96 at the University of Chicago and Enrico Fermi Institute, and Director from 1961-67 of the famous Argonne National Laboratory (became a US citizen in 1961)
 Sir Fred Haigh, clothier
 Len Shackleton, footballer
 Bernard Worsnop FInstP, physicist and expert on X-rays, who worked with Edward Appleton at King's College London, and was later headmaster from 1937-58 of Quintin School

References
 Sunday Times 5 February 1989
 The Times, 14 November 1987

External links
 Carton Bolling College Website
 EduBase Information
 Ofsted Inspection Report 2007
 Former school

News items
 Telegraph & Argus Ofsted article
 Ofsted Inspection (Video)

Schools in Bradford
Educational institutions established in 1977
Secondary schools in the City of Bradford
1977 establishments in England
Academies in the City of Bradford